Francisco Javier de Burgos y Sarragoiti (born in El Puerto de Santa María 1842 – dead in Madrid 1902) was a Spanish journalist and author of comic theatre.

1842 births
1902 deaths
Spanish journalists
Spanish male dramatists and playwrights
People from El Puerto de Santa María
19th-century Spanish dramatists and playwrights
19th-century male writers